John Gunther Dean (February 24, 1926 – June 6, 2019) was an American diplomat. From 1974–1988, he served as the United States ambassador to five nations under four American presidents.

Early years
Dean was born as Gunther Dienstfertig in Breslau, Germany, into a Jewish family, the son of Lucy (Askenazy) and prominent lawyer Joseph Dienstfertig. As a child, he attended the exclusive Von Zawatzki Schule in Breslau. Escaping the rise of Nazism, the family left Germany in December 1938 and arrived in the United States in February. John's original first name was Gunther, however, the immigration officer changed to John Gunther to avoid it from sounding "too German". In March 1939 the family changed its name from "Dienstfertig" to "Dean" before the City Court of New York to better integrate into the crowd in Queens. They eventually arrived in Kansas City, Missouri, where his father briefly lectured at the University of Kansas.

Education 
Graduating from high school in Kansas City at the age of 16, he went on to Harvard University. Dean interrupted his education 1944 to serve in the United States Army. In 1946, he then returned to Harvard and obtained his undergraduate degree (B.S. Magna Cum Laude, 1947). He received his doctorate in law from the Sorbonne (1949), and returned to Harvard again to obtain a graduate degree in international relations (M.A., 1950).

Career before the Foreign Service 
In 1944, Dean became a naturalized United States citizen. He interrupted his education and served in the United States Army from 1944–1946, utilizing his language skills with the Office of Military Intelligence.  Dean was trained at Fort Belvoir, after which he was sent to a top-secret intelligence site named Post Office Box 1142. There, he helped American authorities debrief scientists from Nazi Germany. After he left he was offered a job in the newly formed Central Intelligence Agency, which he refused on advise from his father.

In 1950 Dean worked in government service as an economic analyst with the European Headquarters of the Economic Cooperation Administration in Paris, France. From 1951–1953 he was an industrial analyst with ECA in Brussels, Belgium. From 1953–1956 he was assistant economic commissioner with the International Cooperation Administration in French Indo-China with accreditation in Saigon, Phnom Penh, and Vientiane.

Foreign Service career
Dean passed the Foreign Service Examination in 1954. He formally began his service as an officer with the U.S. Department of State in the spring of 1956. From 1956–1958 he served as a political officer in Vientiane, Laos, and then from 1959–1960 he opened the first American consulate in Lomé, Togo. From 1960–1961 he was Chargé d'affaires in Bamako, Mali, and then became the officer in charge of Mali-Togo affairs in the Department of State from 1961–1963. In 1963 Dean was an adviser to the U.S. delegation to the 18th Session of the United Nations General Assembly, and during 1964–1965 he was an international relations officer in the NATO section of the Department of State. Dean went to Paris in 1965 as a political officer and served there until 1969. From 1969–1970 he was a fellow at Harvard's Center for International Affairs in Cambridge, Massachusetts.

He was then detailed to the U.S. military as Deputy to the Commander of Military Region 1 in South Vietnam where he served as Regional Director for Civil Operations and Revolutionary Development Support (CORDS) until 1972. While in Da Nang, South Vietnam, he helped to protect the Cham Museum for which he was officially thanked in 2005 by the Vietnamese and French authorities. From 1972–1974 he was the deputy chief of mission/Chargé d'affaires in Vientiane, Laos. He is credited for having helped the establishment of a coalition government which saved thousands of lives after the Fall of Saigon in 1975. Dean was appointed Ambassador to Cambodia in March 1974 and served until all American personnel were evacuated on 12 April 1975.

Dean retired from the U.S. Foreign Service in 1989. Dean's freelancing efforts to get the Reagan Administration to reverse its policies on Afghanistan, Pakistan, and India angered high administration officials, and he left government service soon thereafter.

Dean and Israel 

In August 1980, while serving as ambassador to Lebanon, where he had opened links to the PLO, Dean was the target of an assassination attempt, which he believed was directed by Israel. According to him:

Dean's suspicions that Israeli agents may have also been involved in the mysterious plane crash in 1988 that killed President of Pakistan, General Muhammad Zia-ul-Haq, led finally to a decision in Washington to declare him mentally unfit, which forced his resignation from the foreign service after a thirty-year career. Later he was rehabilitated by the State Department, given a distinguished service medal and the insanity charge was confirmed to be phony by a former head of the department's medical service.

Personal life
Dean spoke four languages: English, French, German, and Danish. He was the first U.S. Ambassador to Denmark who learned and spoke Danish, thus gaining significant respect from its people. He was married to the French-born Martine Duphenieux, and they had three grown children. He lived in Switzerland and France but remained active on foreign affairs issues and went to the United States often. He died in June 2019 at the age of 93.

While stationed in Paris (1965–69), Dean played a major role in bringing the U.S.-North Vietnam peace talks to Paris in 1968. In Lebanon, Dean was helpful in obtaining the release of the first American hostages in Teheran. In India, Dean helped bring about the withdrawal of Soviet troops from Afghanistan according to an agreed time table.

In the film The Killing Fields, Dean is portrayed by Ira Wheeler. The evacuation of Phnom Penh scene was filmed near Bangkok in 1983 and Wheeler met Dean, who was then the U.S. Ambassador to Thailand.

References

Bibliography
Book published 2009 DANGER ZONES: A Diplomat's Fight for America's Interests, published by the Association for Diplomatic Studies and Training.

External links

John Gunther Dean's Oral History
John Gunther Dean's Inventory. 11 linear feet of documents he donated to the U.S. National Archives in 2004 and 2005 are partially available to the public at the Jimmy Carter Library.
List of U.S. Ambassadors to Thailand, 1882 to present

1926 births
2019 deaths
People from Wrocław
Harvard Graduate School of Arts and Sciences alumni
Ambassadors of the United States to Cambodia
Ambassadors of the United States to Denmark
Ambassadors of the United States to Lebanon
Ambassadors of the United States to Thailand
Ambassadors of the United States to India
Jewish American military personnel
United States Army personnel of World War II
Military personnel from Missouri
Jewish emigrants from Nazi Germany to the United States
Naturalized citizens of the United States
United States Foreign Service personnel
21st-century American Jews